Tazekka National Park is a national park of Morocco. It was created in 1950 with an initial area of 6.8 km² to protect the natural resources around Jbel Tazekka (elevation 1,980 m), particularly the grove of cedars (Cedrus atlantica), which are isolated on this peak in the Middle Atlas range.

In 1989, the park was extended to include nearly 120 km² of ecologically important areas, including forests of cork oak and holm oak, as well as canyons, caves, cascades, and rural landscapes.

Access
Tazekka National Park is located in the Middle Atlas, near the city of Taza.

Climate
Atmospheric moisture condenses as it is orographically lifted over the mountain. As a result, the mountain frequently shows a cap cloud and annually receives approximately 180 cm of precipitation, particularly in the form of snow.

Fauna
Mammals are represented by North African boars (Sus scrofa algira), porcupines (Hystrix cristata), otters (Lutra lutra), small-spotted genets (Genetta genetta), hares (Lepus capensis), African wolves (Canis anthus algirensis), and red foxes (Vulpes vulpes).

Barbary leopards (Panthera pardus panthera), striped hyenas (Hyaena hyaena) and caracals (Caracal caracal), which were found once in the area, are extinct. The Barbary stag (Cervus elaphus barbarus) was extinct as well, but has been reintroduced recently.

References

External links
  Official website

National parks of Morocco
Protected areas established in 1950
Atlas Mountains
Geography of Fès-Meknès